Alex or Alec Thomson may refer to:

Alex Thomson (scientist) (born 1989), Australian Scientist
Alex Thomson (cinematographer) (1929–2007), British cinematographer
Alex Thomson (cricketer) (born 1993), English cricketer
Alex Thomson (sailor) (born 1974), British yachtsman
Alex Thomson (journalist) (born 1960), British television journalist and newscaster
Alex Thomson (rugby union) (born 1921), Scotland international rugby union player
Alec Thomson (1873–1953), Australian politician
Alec Thomson (footballer) (1901–1975), Scottish footballer (Celtic FC, Dunfermline Athletic FC and Scotland)

See also
Alexander Thomson (disambiguation)